Sergejs Ivanovich Naumovs (born 4 April 1969 in Riga, Soviet Union) is a Latvian former professional ice hockey goaltender.

Naumovs began career with Dinamo Riga in the Soviet League.  In 1994, he moved to North America and had spells with the Oklahoma City Blazers, San Diego Gulls, Las Vegas Thunder and the Long Beach Ice Dogs.  He moved to Sweden's Elitserien with Leksands IF in 2000 before moving back to America with the Greensboro Generals.  The next season, he returned to Sweden, signing with Djurgårdens IF Hockey.  He then played for various Russian teams from 2002 to 2006 before moving to Italy.  In 2008, he  played for Dinamo Riga in the Kontinental Hockey League.

Currently he is a goalkeepers coach in CSKA Moscow.

References

External links
 

1969 births
Living people
Bolzano HC players
Dinamo Riga players
Djurgårdens IF Hockey players
Expatriate ice hockey players in Russia
Greensboro Generals players
HC Khimik Voskresensk players
HC Vityaz players
Ice hockey players at the 2002 Winter Olympics
Ice hockey players at the 2006 Winter Olympics
Ice hockey players at the 2010 Winter Olympics
Las Vegas Thunder players
Latvian ice hockey coaches
Latvian ice hockey goaltenders
Latvian people of Russian descent
Latvian sports coaches
Leksands IF players
Long Beach Ice Dogs (IHL) players
Minnesota Blue Ox players
Oklahoma City Blazers (1992–2009) players
Olympic ice hockey players of Latvia
Orlando Jackals players
Sacramento River Rats players
Salavat Yulaev Ufa players
San Diego Gulls (WCHL) players
Severstal Cherepovets players
SKA Saint Petersburg players
Soviet ice hockey players
Ice hockey people from Riga
Torpedo Nizhny Novgorod players